Robert Bentley Suthers was born in Manchester in Lancashire, England in 1871. Very little is known about his personal life besides that which can be inferred from the 1911 UK census and the military records of his son, Robert Eric Suthers. Robert married a woman named Alice and fathered a son, Robert Eric Suthers. R. E. Suthers was killed in the First Battle of the Aisne during the First World War on 2 August 1918. He was nineteen. After his son's death, Robert Bentley Suthers became a writer for The Clarion, a socialist newspaper. He published the majority of his work through The Clarion and engaged in a long philosophical debate regarding the nature of free will with G.K Chesterton. This debate would be referenced in Chesterton's book Orthodoxy.

Bibliography

Books 

 1907 – Mind your own business
 1909 – Common objections to socialism answered
 1908 – John Bull and Doctor Protection
 1906 – My Right To Work
 original from University of California
 original from New York Public Library

Pamphlets 

 "A Man a Woman and a Dog"
 "Jack's Wife"
 "The Clarion Song Book"
 "The Clarion Birthday Book"

References

External links
 

1871 births
Year of death missing
English writers